Below is a list of radio stations in North America by media market.

United States

By State

States

 Alabama
 Alaska
 Arizona
 Arkansas
 California
 Colorado
 Connecticut
 Delaware
 Florida
 Georgia
 Hawaii
 Idaho
 Illinois
 Indiana
 Iowa
 Kansas
 Kentucky
 Louisiana
 Maine
 Maryland
 Massachusetts
 Michigan
 Minnesota
 Mississippi
 Missouri
 Montana
 Nebraska
 Nevada
 New Hampshire
 New Jersey
 New Mexico
 New York
 North Carolina
 North Dakota
 Ohio
 Oklahoma
 Oregon
 Pennsylvania
 Rhode Island
 South Carolina
 South Dakota
 Tennessee
 Texas
 Utah
 Vermont
 Virginia
 Washington
 West Virginia
 Wisconsin
 Wyoming
 Washington, DC

Territories:

 American Samoa
 Guam
 Northern Mariana Islands
 Puerto Rico
 U.S. Virgin Islands

Other:

 Channel 6
 Sirius XM Radio

By callsign
In the United States, radio stations are assigned callsigns that either start with K (for those located west of the Mississippi River), or W (for those located east of the Mississippi River).

 AM radio stations by call sign (starting with KA–KF)
 AM radio stations by call sign (starting with WA–WF)

 AM radio stations by call sign (starting with KG–KM)
 AM radio stations by call sign (starting with WG–WM)

 AM radio stations by call sign (starting with KN–KS)
 AM radio stations by call sign (starting with WN–WS)

 AM radio stations by call sign (starting with KT–KZ)
 AM radio stations by call sign (starting with WT–WZ)

 FM radio stations by call sign (starting with KA–KC)
 FM radio stations by call sign (starting with WA–WC)

 FM radio stations by call sign (starting with KD–KF)
 FM radio stations by call sign (starting with WD–WF)

 FM radio stations by call sign (starting with KG–KJ)
 FM radio stations by call sign (starting with WG–WJ)

 FM radio stations by call sign (starting with KK–KM)
 FM radio stations by call sign (starting with WK–WM)

 FM radio stations by call sign (starting with KN–KP)
 FM radio stations by call sign (starting with WN–WP)

 FM radio stations by call sign (starting with KQ–KS)
 FM radio stations by call sign (starting with WQ–WS)

 FM radio stations by call sign (starting with KT–KV)
 FM radio stations by call sign (starting with WT–WV)

 FM radio stations by call sign (starting with KW–KZ)
 FM radio stations by call sign (starting with WW–WZ)

By frequency
In the United States, radio stations are assigned frequencies on both AM and FM bands; see Lists of radio stations by frequency for these lists.

Canada

 Abitibi-Témiscamingue
 Calgary
 Cape Breton
 Central Ontario
 Cornwall
 Edmonton
 First Nations
 Fort McMurray
 Fredericton
 Grande Prairie
 Halifax
 Hamilton
 KW
 Kenora
 Kingston
 Lethbridge
 London
 Mauricie
 Medicine Hat
 Midwestern Ontario
 Moncton
 Montreal
 North Bay
 Northern Interior
 Okanagan
 Ottawa
 Ottawa Valley
 PEI
 Pembina Valley
 Peterborough
 Quebec City
 Quinte
 Rainy River
 Red Deer
 Regina
 Saguenay
 Saint John
 Saskatoon
 Sault Ste. Marie, Ontario
 Sherbrooke
 Simcoe County, Ontario
 Southwestern Ontario
 St. John's
 Sudbury
 Thompson-Cariboo
 Thunder Bay
 Timiskaming
 Timmins
 Toronto
 Vancouver Island
 Vancouver
 Westman
 Whitehorse
 Winnipeg

Mexico

 Aguascalientes
 Baja California
 Baja California Sur
 Campeche
 Chiapas
 Chihuahua
 Ciudad Acuña, Coahuila
 Ciudad Juárez, Chihuahua
 Coahuila
 Colima
 Durango
 Guanajuato
 Guerrero
 Hidalgo
 Jalisco
 Mexicali, Baja California
 Mexico City
 Mexico
 Mexico State
 Michoacán
 Morelos
 Nayarit
 Nogales, Sonora
 Nuevo León
 Oaxaca
 Piedras Negras, Coahuila
 Puebla
 Querétaro
 Quintana Roo
 San Luis Potosí
 Sinaloa
 Sonora
 Tabasco
 Tijuana, Baja California
 Tlaxcala
 Veracruz
 Yucatán
 Zacatecas

See also
 List of television stations in North America by media market
 Call signs in North America

References

External links
2001 List of U.S. Radio Markets (ranked by size) 
Glossary of radio market terms 
List of qualitative diary markets from Arbitron 
US Metro map from Arbitron 

Media Market